Gewiss–Bianchi was an Italian professional cycling team that existed from 1979 to 1989.

The team was selected to race in eleven consecutive editions of the Giro d'Italia from 1979 to 1989, where they achieved 19 stage wins.

Major wins

1979
Stage 15 Giro d'Italia, Giuseppe Martinelli
1980
 Giro d'Italia
 Mountains classification, Claudio Bortolotto
Stage 16, Giuseppe Martinelli
 Vuelta a España
Prologue & Stage 16b, Roberto Visentini
Stage 3, Giuseppe Martinelli
1981
Stages 8 & 12 Giro d'Italia, Moreno Argentin
1982
Stage 8 Giro d'Italia, Moreno Argentin
1983
Giro del Veneto, Alfio Vandi
Stages 7 & 21 Giro d'Italia, Moreno Argentin
1984
Giro del Veneto, Jesper Worre
Stages 3 & 5 Giro d'Italia, Moreno Argentin
1985
 Giro d'Italia
 Young rider classification, Alberto Volpi
Stages 9 & 18, Paolo Rosola
1987
Stage 1 Vuelta a Andalucía, Moreno Argentin
Stages 2 & 4 Tirreno–Adriatico, Moreno Argentin
Liège–Bastogne–Liège, Moreno Argentin
Stage 2 Vuelta a España, Paolo Rosola
Stages 5 & 17 Vuelta a España, Roberto Pagnin
Stages 2, 4 & 7 Giro d'Italia, Moreno Argentin
Stages 8, 10 & 20 Giro d'Italia, Paolo Rosola
Stage 2 Coors Classic, Emanuele Bombini
Stages 5, 11, 12b & 15 Coors Classic, Paolo Rosola
Stage 16 Coors Classic, Moreno Argentin
Schaan Criterium, Paolo Rosola
Giro di Lombardia, Moreno Argentin
Giro di Toscana, Renato Piccolo
1988
Stage 1 Critérium International, Moreno Argentin
Stages 10 & 20 Giro d'Italia, Paolo Rosola
Overall Tour of Sweden, Jesper Worre
Overall Grabs–Voralp, Arno Küttel
Stage 1a, Arno Küttel
 National Road Race Championships, Lars Wahlqvist
Giro del Veneto, Moreno Argentin
Visp–Grächen, Arno Küttel
Stage 5b Tour of Denmark, Paolo Rosola
1989
Stage 3 Vuelta a Andalucía, Paolo Rosola
GP du canton d'Argovie, Paolo Rosola
 National Road Race Championships, Moreno Argentin
Stage 5 GP Guillaume Tell, Davide Cassani

References

Defunct cycling teams based in Italy
1979 establishments in Italy
1989 disestablishments in Italy
Cycling teams established in 1979
Cycling teams disestablished in 1989